Eric Penrose Treverrow (1926 – 2 October 2015) was a Scottish footballer who played in the Irish League with Ballymena United. He won ten inter-league caps for the Irish League.

Born in Renfrewshire in 1926, he was playing for Scottish junior club Parkhead when recruited by Ballymena in 1948. He went on to make a record 559 appearances for the club and was a member of the team that won the Irish Cup in 1958. He appeared ten times for the Irish League representative team between 1950 and 1953 and was Ulster Footballer of the Year in 1952. He died in Newtownards, County Down on 2 October 2015.

References

External links
Northern Ireland's Footballing Greats

1926 births
2015 deaths
Scottish footballers
Ulster Footballers of the Year
Ballymena United F.C. players
NIFL Premiership players
Footballers from Glasgow
Association footballers not categorized by position
Parkhead F.C. players
Scottish Junior Football Association players